"Blue-lined triggerfish" can refer to either of 2 species of such fishes:

 Pseudobalistes fuscus (blue triggerfish or rippled triggerfish)
 Xanthichthys caeruleolineatus